is the capital city of Yamanashi Prefecture, Japan. ,  the city had an estimated population of 187,985 in 90,924 households, and a population density of 880 persons per km2.

Overview

Toponymy
Kōfu's name means "capital of Kai Province". During the Sengoku period, it was famous as the stronghold of Takeda Shingen.

Cityscapes

Geography

Kōfu is located in north-central Yamanashi Prefecture which is in Central Honshu. It extends from the northern border of the prefecture with Nagano Prefecture to the south until it almost reaches the prefecture's southern border. It is narrow along its east–west axis. The city bisects the Kōfu Basin and is 250 to 300 meters above sea level. Kōfu is surrounded by mountains on all sides. Three quarters of Kōfu's territory is a part of Mount Kinpu in the north. Much of the northern portion of the city is within the Chichibu-Tama-Kai National Park. Mount Fuji is visible in the distance from Kōfu to the south.

Climate
Kōfu has a humid subtropical climate (Cfa), though it is less wet than either the south or Sea of Japan coast due to its location in a shielded mountain valley. The average annual temperature in Kōfu is 11.9 °C. The average annual rainfall is 1345 mm with September as the wettest month. The temperatures are highest on average in August, at around 24.3 °C, and lowest in January, at around -0.1 °C. Temperature ranges are noticeably greater than in coastal regions: in 2004 Kōfu reached a temperature of  previously almost unknown in Japan, and it has fallen below  as early as 26 October, which is about a month before the earliest freezing temperatures in such coastal cities as Kanazawa or Tokyo.

Surrounding municipalities
Yamanashi Prefecture
Kai
Yamanashi
Fuefuki
Hokuto
Chūō
Shōwa
Fujikawaguchiko
Ichikawamisato
Minobu
Nagano Prefecture
Kawakami

Demographics
Per Japanese census data, the population of Kōfu as remained relatively stable over the past 50 years.

History

Prehistoric Ages
Archaeologists have discovered evidence of human settlement in the Kōfu area dating to the Japanese Paleolithic period, with continuous settlement through the Jōmon, Yayoi and Kofun periods.

Ancient Ages
During the Nara period, the provincial temple of Kai Province was established in what is now Kōfu, indicating that the Nara period provincial capital was located nearby, as the name of the city implies.

During the Heian period, a branch of the Minamoto clan, the "Kai-Genji" ruled over vast shōen estates, and developed  a military force noted for its use of cavalry.

Middle Ages
By the Muromachi period, a branch of the Kai-Genji, the Takeda clan came to dominate the area, and built a castle in what is now part of Kōfu.

Under the rule of Takeda Nobutora, Kōfu was rebuilt as a castle town starting in 1519, and remained the capital of the Takeda clan under Takeda Shingen and his son Takeda Katsuyori.

Early Modern Ages
During the Edo period, Kai Province was tenryō territory ruled directly by the Tokugawa shogunate, and Kōfu Castle remained its administrative center. In 1705, in a signal honour, it was conferred on Yanagisawa Yoshiyasu a favourite of the fifth shōgun. He was a member of the Yanagisawa clan descendants of the "Kai-Genji", the branch of the Minamoto clan which had been enfeoffed with the province of Kai in the eleventh century. His son, Yoshiyasu was transferred to Yamato-Koriyama Castle in 1724 after which Kofu Castle was again held directly by the Shogunate.

Late Modern Ages
Following the Meiji restoration, with the establishment of the modern municipalities system, the town of Kōfu was proclaimed on July 1, 1889.

The city experienced a major flood disaster in 1907 (明治40年の大水害) caused by heavy rain in a typhoon from the night of August 21, 1907 and by  deforestation which was accelerated in Yamanashi Prefecture, due to the need for wood for fuel of the steam engines of the growing industrial policy of the Fujimura Prefectural Government.
A police officer inspected the stricken area from August 23 to October 10, 1907.
Patrol diaries of Masaki Tsukasa Kasaburo said "This heavy rainfall causes rivers to run down, landslides and levee failures, bridge piers destruction, etc., resulting in the destruction of homes and villages, village isolation, runoff and runoff, and traffic disruptions caused serious damage 233 people died, 5757 houses were run out, 650 hectares of lands have been buried or run down, 3353 landslides, collapse and damage distance of about 140 kilometers of levees, runoff and burial of roads, the damage distance was about 500 kilometers, 393 telephone poles collapsed. It was the largest natural disaster in modern times in Yamanashi Prefecture.

During World War II, much of the city was destroyed by United States Army Air Forces B-29 Superfortress bombers during a major air raid during the night of 6 July 1945.

Contemporary Ages
Kōfu was designated as one of the special cities of Japan on April 1, 2000.
On March 1, 2006, Kōfu, with a population of 193,795, absorbed the town of Nakamichi (from Higashiyatsushiro District), and the northern part of the village of Kamikuishiki (from Nishiyatsushiro District) increasing the population to 201,184.

On April 1, 2019, Kōfu's city status was elevated to a core city.

Government

Council
Kōfu has a mayor-council form of government with a directly elected mayor and a unicameral city legislature of 32 members. The city supplies nine members to the Yamanashi Prefectural Assembly. In terms of national politics, the city is divided between the Yamanashi 1st district and the Yamanashi 2nd district for the House of Representatives, the lower house of the National Diet of Japan.

External relations

Twin towns – Sister cities

International
Sister Cities

National
Sister City

Economy

The city is a regional commercial and transportation center for central Yamanashi Prefecture. Local industries include food processing including wine production, textiles and crystalware.

Media
 Yamanashi Broadcasting System
 UHF Television Yamanashi

Education

Universities and Colleges
Public
University of Yamanashi
Yamanashi Prefectural University
Private
Yamanashi Gakuin University
Yamanashi Eiwa College
Yamanashi Gakuin Junior College

Primary and secondary education
 Kōfu has 25 public elementary schools and 11 public junior high schools operated by the city government, as well as one national combined elementary/middle school. In addition, there are two private elementary schools and three private junior high schools. The city has eight public high schools operated by the Yamanashi Prefectural Board of Education, and five private high schools.

Transportation

Airways

Airports
The nearest airport is Matsumoto Airport & Shizuoka Airport or Haneda Airport & Narita International Airport.

Railways

Conventional Lines
East Japan Railway Company（JR East）
Chūō Main Line：-  -   -
Central Japan Railway Company（JR TōKai）
Minobu Line：-  -  -  -  -  -

Buses

Bus Terminus
Kōfu Station Bus Terminu

Roads

Expressway
  Chūō Expressway

Japan National Route

Local attractions

Historical Sites
Kai Zenkō-ji 
Kōfu Castle
Tsutsujigasaki Castle
Takeda Shrine
Yōgaiyama Castle
Ōmaruyama Kofun

Other sites
Yumura Onsen
Yamanashi Science Museum

Culture

Festivals

Shingen-ko Festival

It is held annually on the first or second weekend of April and celebrates the legacy of Takeda Shingen. The festival is three days long. Usually a famous Japanese celebrity plays the part of Takeda Shingen. There are several parades going to and from the Takeda Shrine and Kōfu Castle. This is the largest public history play in Japan. In 2012 the event was included in the Guinness World Records as the "largest gathering of samurai" in the world with 1061 participants.

Sports

Notable people from Kofu

Banjō Ginga – voice actor
Hideo Hagiwara – woodblock print artist
Tsuneo Horiuchi – former manager of Yomiuri Giants baseball team
Takao Kajimoto – former professional baseball player and sports announcer
Junichi Kanemaru - voice actor
Yoshinobu Kanemaru – professional wrestler
Hidetoshi Nakata - football player who last played with the Bolton Wanderers in the Premier League, but has since retired following the 2006 World Cup.
Naoko Takeuchi – manga artist, creator of Sailor Moon and other comics.
Fujizakura Yoshimori – former sumo wrestler
Ryūden Gōshi - sumo wrestler
 Hiroki Nakamura – founder and designer of cult fashion brand Visvim
 Mariko Tsutsui - actress with notable lead roles in Kōji Fukada's Harmonium and A Girl Missing

List of mayors of Kofu 
This is a list of Kofu majors starting from 1889.

Itsupei Wakao (若尾逸平) 29 August 1889 to 3 June 1890
Tadao Takagi (高木忠雄) 11 July 1890 to 28 September 1897
Hikotaro Ishihara (石原彦太郎) 6 November 1897 to 18 June 1898
Kunsaku Kobayashi (小林董作) 19 September 1898 to 18 June 1906
Tamizo Wakao (若尾民造) 24 July 1906 to 5 March 1907
Heishiro Kato (加藤平四郎) 20 April 1907 to 17 August 1915
Tadayoshi Natori (名取忠愛) 15 January 1916 to 25 June 1919
                          23 September 1922 to 14 March 1923                

Nobutsugu Hori (堀信次) 23 October 1919 to 19 June 1922
Atsuo Ishii (石井淳雄) 31 July 1923 to 30 July 1927
Jihei Narishima (成島治平) 8 October 1927 to 8 August 1931
Eiji Shinkai (新海栄治) 24 August 1931 to 26 August 1935
                       12 September 1939 to 11 September 1943
Itsuzo Saiki (斎木逸造) 27 August 1935 to 11 September 1939 
Jiro Noguchi (野口二郎) 12 September 1943 to 27 February 1946
Moemon Imai (今井茂右衛門) 18 March 1946 to 3 September 1947

Shigehisa Kawamura (川村茂久) 10 October 1947 to 25 December 1948
Tatsuo Yamamoto (山本達雄) 25 February 1949 to 22 February 1953
Keijiro Takano (鷹野啓次郎) 25 February 1953 to 11 November 1968
Kiyoshi Akiyama (秋山清) 29 November 1968 to 24 February 1971
Chikayoshi Kawaguchi (河口親賀) 25 April 1971 to 26 April 1983
Chuzo Hara (原忠三) 27 April 1983 to 26 April 1991
Hidehiko Yamamoto (山本栄彦) 27 April 1991 to 19 December 2002
Masanobu Miyajima (宮島雅展) 3 April 2003 to 1 February 2015
Yuichi Higuchi (樋口雄一) 2 February 2015 to Incumbent

References

External links

Official Website 

Cities in Yamanashi Prefecture
Kōfu, Yamanashi